al-Quwayʿiyah (also El Kuveyiye)  is a city in Riyadh Province, Saudi Arabia.It is located in the west of Riyadh, 165 km away. It is considered as a major stopping point on Riyadh-Makkah Highway. AlQuway'iyah's population is approximately 126,161 people, therefore, it is considered to be one of the largest governorates of the Kingdom including a large number of villages of the province and it includes several government departments, colleges and health institutes.

See also 

 List of cities and towns in Saudi Arabia
 Regions of Saudi Arabia

References

Populated places in Riyadh Province